Nadia Cortassa (born 5 January 1978 in Turin) is an athlete from Italy. She competes in triathlon.

Cortassa competed at the second Olympic triathlon at the 2004 Summer Olympics. She took fifth place with a total time of 2:05:45.35.

External links
 

1978 births
Living people
Italian female triathletes
Olympic triathletes of Italy
Triathletes at the 2004 Summer Olympics
Sportspeople from Turin
21st-century Italian women